The men's 30 kilometre cross-country skiing competition at the 1976 Winter Olympics in Innsbruck, Austria, was held on Thursday 5 February at Seefeld in Tirol.

Each skier started at half a minute intervals, skiing the entire 30 kilometre course.

Results
Sources:

References

External links
 Final results (International Ski Federation)

Men's cross-country skiing at the 1976 Winter Olympics
Men's 30 kilometre cross-country skiing at the Winter Olympics